The Mayor of Hyderabad is the head of the Greater Hyderabad Municipal Corporation which is abbreviated as GHMC. The tenure for the post of GHMC is for 5 years. Currently the GHMC consists of 150 wards. Each ward is headed by a ward member and these elected ward members elect a mayor for the corporation. Gadwal Vijayalakshmi is the present "Mayor of Hyderabad" belonging to Telangana Rashtra Samithi

List

References 

Mayors of Hyderabad, India